Co-founded in 1979 by Gloria Steinem and Kristina Kiehl, Voters for Choice was the United States's largest independent, nonpartisan,  pro-choice political action committee. Its mission was to raise money and promote policies to maintain safe, legal and accessible abortion services for all women, regardless of geographical location, age or economic status. Based in Washington, D.C., its main agenda was to elect candidates who support a person's right to make decisions regarding abortion, contraception, and child-bearing without government interference.

As part of this work, Voters for Choice testified for and against candidates for the Supreme Court of the United States and endorsed candidates for public office. During the 1991–1992 election cycle, Voters for Choice gave $265,000 to pro-choice candidates, 89% going to Democrats. At their peak, they raised about $1.2 million per year.

The Planned Parenthood Action Fund merged with Voters for Choice for the 2004 United States Presidential election.

References

External links
Voters for Choice records at the Sophia Smith Collection, Smith College
Archived copy of the Voters for Choice website at the Library of Congress
C-SPAN interview with Kristina Kiehl about abortion in the 1986 United States House of Representatives elections
C-SPAN footage of Kristina Kiehl testimony regarding the nomination of Anthony M. Kennedy to be associate justice of the United States Supreme Court

Abortion-rights organizations in the United States
United States political action committees